Bryan Holme (1913–1990) was an American author and publisher who founded Studio Books, a subsidiary of Viking Press. He also published The Studio, a London-based art magazine.

In August 1990, he died at the age of 78 due to kidney failure.

Early life and career 
Born in the United Kingdom, he moved to the United States in 1929. Later, he founded Studio Publications.

Bibliography
The Kennedy Years (1963)
The World in Vogue (1963)
Georgia O'Keeffe (1976)
Advertising: Reflections of a century (1982, Heinemann)
Princely Feasts and Festivals (1988, Thames & Hudson)
A Clowder of Cats (1989, Herbert Press)

References

1913 deaths
1990 deaths
20th-century American writers